Agalmaceros is an extinct genus of deer of the Cervidae family, that lived in South America during the Pleistocene. The only species currently known is A. blicki. Remains have only been found in Ecuador. It showed a clear affinity to Andean or temperate habitats. Agalmaceros blicki is estimated to have been  in weight.

References

Capreolinae
Prehistoric cervoids
Pleistocene even-toed ungulates
Pleistocene extinctions
Pleistocene mammals of South America
Uquian
Ensenadan
Lujanian
Pleistocene Ecuador
Fossils of Ecuador
Fossil taxa described in 1952
Prehistoric even-toed ungulate genera